Deh Chal (also Romanized as Deh Chāl) is a village in Deh Chal Rural District, in the Central District of Khondab County, Markazi Province, Iran. At the 2006 census, its population was 1,063, in 259 families.

References 

Populated places in Khondab County